M'diq-Fnideq (Berber: ⵜⴰⵖⵎⴰⵟ - ⴼⵏⵉⴷⵇ) is a prefecture in Tanger-Tetouan-Al Hoceima, Morocco. The seat of the prefecture is M'diq.

Geography
M'diq-Fnideq borders Fahs-Anjra Province to the west, Tétouan Province to the south, the Mediterranean Sea to the east, the Spanish exclave of Ceuta to the northeast and the Strait of Gibraltar to the north. Jebel Musa located in the northern part of the prefecture is its highest point at 851 metres. The coastline at the foot Jebel Musa is a Ramsar site, and this area and portions of the mountainous interior are part of the Intercontinental Biosphere Reserve of the Mediterranean.

The prefecture is drained by five wadis or seasonal rivers: Oued Smir, Oued Negro, Oued Fnideq, Oued Rmel and Oued Martil. The coastal lagoon of Oued Smir and its reservoir upstream were designated a Ramsar site in 2019.

The prefecture experiences a mediterranean climate. The easterly prevailing wind in the prefecture is known as the chergui.

History
M'diq-Fnideq was created in 2004 from the municipalities of M'diq and Fnideq and the rural commune of Allyene, all formerly part of Tétouan Province. Martil was annexed to the prefecture from Tétouan Province in 2010.

Government
The following people have served as governors of M'diq-Fnideq: 
Mohamed Yacoubi, 2005–2010
Abdelmajid Hankari, 2010–2012
Mohamed Mrabet, 2012–2014
Abdelkrim Hamdi, 2014–2016
Hassan Bouya, 2016–2018
Yassine Jari, 2018–

Subdivisions
M'diq-Fnideq comprises three urban communes, M'Diq, Fnideq and Martil; and two rural communes, Allyene and Belyounech.

Infrastructure
The Tetouan–Fnideq expressway connects Tetouan with M'Diq and Fnideq and was opened in 2008.

First built in the 1970s, the port at M'Diq was expanded in 2009 and 2012 to accommodate recreational and fishing activities. In 2012 it ranked third by tonnage of fish landed among fishing ports in Tanger-Tetouan-Al Hoceima.

From 1918 to 1958, a railway connecting Tetouan and Ceuta ran through M'diq and Fnideq.

The Smir Dam, located west of M'diq, was built in 1991. It has a capacity of 40.7 million cubic metres and supplies potable and industrial water to the prefecture.

Three of the eleven schools affiliated with Abdelmalek Essaâdi University are located in Martil: the Poly-disciplinary Faculty, the École Normale Supérieure, and the Faculty of Letters and Humanities.

The prefecture has two hospitals at M'diq and Fnideq.

References

External links